Pascal Schürpf (born 15 July 1989) is a Swiss professional footballer who plays as a midfielder or striker for FC Luzern in the Swiss Super League.

Career
Born in Basel, Schürpf started his football in the youth system at BSC Old Boys before joining the youth system of FC Basel in 1999. He started his senior football in Basel's under-21 squad and scored 32 goals in 42 appearances. On 29 May 2008, he signed his first professional contract with the club. This has since been renewed and his new contract is valid to June 2014.

During the 2008/09 season, Schürpf was loaned out to FCB's city neighbours, FC Concordia Basel, where he played fourteen games and scored five goals. In the 2009–10 Swiss Super League season he returned to FCB and played his Swiss Super League debut on 14 February 2010 as substitute in the 3–1 away win against Neuchâtel Xamax. Schürpf won the national Double with Basel. During the next season Schürpf scored his first League goal for Basel on 21 August 2010 in the 1–1 away draw against FC Thun. However, Schürpf played only a total of eleven first team appearances in the Swiss Super League during the two seasons following his return.

Therefore he was loaned out to FC Lugano in the Challenge League until the end of the season. He made his debut in the Lugano colours in the 2–1 home win against FC Vaduz on 21 February 2011. His first goal for Lugano was the winning goal in the 3–2 away win against FC Biel-Bienne.

For the season 2011/12 he was recalled to Basel. In July 2011 he played with Basel in the Uhrencup and won the tournament. But during the first half of the season he only played in three league matches. Again, therefore, he was loaned out to gain playing experience. This time to  FC Aarau, again in the Challenge League. In Aarau his contract was over one and a half years. However, the loan was cancelled in August 2012 and he returned to Basel to play for the reserve team in the 1. Liga Promotion, the third highest tier of Swiss football.

On 31 January 2013, it was announced that Schürpf is loaned out to AC Bellinzona so that he could gain playing experience in a higher league.

During July 2013 Basel announced that they were loaning out Schürpf to FC Vaduz, who played in the Challenge League, for the season. During the season Vaduz won promotion and Schürpf played all 36 games and scored 10 goals. At they end of the loan period Basel did not prolong their contract with Schürpf and so he signed for Vaduz on a permanent basis. During the 2014–15 Swiss Super League season Schürpf played 34 games scoring 7 goals. He missed the entire 2015–16 season due to injury.

On 1 March 2017 it was announced that Schürpf had signed a two and a half year contract with Luzern. He played his debut for his new club on 5 March 2017 in the Swissporarena against Grasshopper Club. He was substituted in during the 64th minute and scored the equaliser with a header just eight minutes later and the game ended with a 1–1 draw.

Honours and titles
Basel
 Swiss Champion at U-18 level: 2005/06
 Swiss Cup Winner at U-19/U-18 level: 2005/06
 Swiss Super League: 2009–10
 Swiss Cup: 2009–10
 Uhrencup Winner: 2011

Vaduz
 Challenge League champions and promotion: 2013–14

References

External links
 Profile at FC Basel 
 Profile at Swiss Football League Website (FC Basel) 
 Profile at Swiss Football League Website (AC Bellinzona) 
 

1989 births
Living people
Association football midfielders
Association football forwards
Swiss men's footballers
Switzerland under-21 international footballers
Switzerland youth international footballers
BSC Young Boys players
FC Basel players
FC Concordia Basel players
FC Lugano players
AC Bellinzona players
FC Vaduz players
Swiss expatriate footballers
Swiss expatriate sportspeople in Liechtenstein
Expatriate footballers in Liechtenstein
FC Aarau players
FC Luzern players
Swiss Super League players
Swiss Challenge League players
Footballers from Basel